"Wishing on the Same Star" is the second and final single by American singer-songwriter Keedy. Written by Diane Warren, the single was released in 1991 by Arista Records. It peaked at number 86 on the Billboard Hot 100; a second push was made to American pop stations in 1992,  but it failed to chart.

Track listing

Charts

Girlfriend version

Australian all-female pop group Girlfriend covered "Wishing on the Same Star" as their seventh single, released by BMG Australia in November 1993. It peaked at number 44 on the ARIA Charts.

Track listing

Charts

Namie Amuro version

Japanese singer-songwriter Namie Amuro covered "Wishing on the Same Star" as her 21st single, released by Avex Trax on September 11, 2002. It was used as the theme song of the 2002 film Inochi. The song was meant to be her last before a hiatus that would have seen her transplanting herself from Tokyo to New York City for the purposes of artist development. As the last of her singles as a pop artist, it is the most commercially successful from the 2003 album Style. Amuro performed the song on the 53rd Kōhaku Uta Gassen.

The single peaked at No. 2 on Oricon's singles chart and sold over 97,000 copies. It was certified Gold by the RIAJ in December 2003.

Track listing

Personnel
Namie Amuro – vocals, background vocals
Kareb James – background vocals
Yuko Kawai – background vocals
Muriyama-Kiriyama Strings – strings

Production
Producers – Masaki Iehara, Cobra Endo
Arrangement – Masaki Iehara, Cobra Endo
Strings arrangement – Tatsuya Murayama
Mixing – Koji Morimoto, Rob Chiarelli
Mixing assistant – Sang Park
Instrument programming – David L. Huff, Cobra Endo
Vocal direction – Mayumi Harada
Music video director – Ugichin
Choreographer – Warner

Chart position

Certification

Other versions
The song has been covered by several other artists, most notably by Puerto Rican singer Chayanne as "Mi Primer Amor" (1992), which peaked at number 8 on the Billboard Hot Latin Tracks., American dance singer Judy Cheeks (1995), German Eurodance group DJ Company (1997) and by American singer Myra (2001). In 1997, Diane Warren released a promotional compilation of songs written by her titled A Passion For Music. Included on the track list is the original demo of the song, sung by Susie Benson. In Brazil by Sandy & Junior in the Portuguese version "A Estrela Que Mais Brilhar".

References

External links
Keedy
 

Girlfriend
 

Namie Amuro
 
 

1991 singles
1993 singles
2002 singles
1991 songs
Keedy songs
Girlfriend (band) songs
Chayanne songs
Namie Amuro songs
Songs written by Diane Warren
Arista Records singles
Avex Trax singles
Japanese film songs